Steel & Glass Films Ltd was a film production company set up in 2004 by screenwriter/director Andrew Jones and actor Gavin Dando and was jointly based in Swansea and Newport in South Wales.

The company's only production was the 2005 feature film Teenage Wasteland, written and directed by Jones and produced by Dando. The film premiered at the Swansea Bay Film Festival in 2006 and won the award for 'Best Feature Under 75 Minutes'.

In August 2006, the company ceased trading as a limited company.

External links
Official Website

Film production companies of the United Kingdom